Grevillea dimorpha, commonly known as flame grevillea or olive grevillea, is a species of flowering plant in the family Proteaceae and is endemic to the Grampians National Park in Victoria, Australia. It is an erect to spreading shrub with elliptic to linear or egg-shaped leaves with the narrower end towards the base, and groups of bright red flowers.

Description

Taxonomy
Grevillea dimorpha was first formally described in 1855 by Ferdinand von Mueller in Transactions of the Philosophical Society of Victoria from specimens collected in the Grampians. The specific epithet (dimorpha) means "having two forms".

Distribution and habitat
Flame grevillea grows in heathy woodland and forest on sandy soil in the Grampians National Park in Victoria.

Conservation status
This grevillea is listed as "rare" in Victoria, on the Department of Sustainability and Environment's Advisory list of rare or threatened plants in Victoria.

References

dimorpha
Flora of Victoria (Australia)
Proteales of Australia
Taxa named by Ferdinand von Mueller
Plants described in 1855